Selma Chalabi is a British radio producer and journalist for BBC Wales.  She was born in the United Kingdom to an Iraqi father and English mother, and was raised in Winchester.

Career
She has produced numerous short films about her father's homeland, in a bid to not only discover more of her Arabic roots but to also address media stereotypes towards Iraqis.  She worked with and received support from Valley and Vale Community Arts when directing and producing Land Of My Father.  Stories collected by Chalabi when interviewing her family for Land Of My Father inspired her to create Blue Eyes, a short film about her Iraqi grandmother.  Blue Eyes was made as part of the BBC Wales "Capture Wales" project, and became recipient of the Round 2 Award winner of the Commedia Millennium Awards

Filmography
 Land Of My Father
 Blue Eyes
 The Note

References

External links
Review "Film Gives Iraqis a Voice" on BBC

Video
Land Of My Father
Blue Eyes
The Note

Living people
Iraqi film directors
Iraqi women film directors
British people of Iraqi descent
English film directors
British women film directors
British Shia Muslims
Year of birth missing (living people)